The 2010 Georgetown Hoyas football team represented Georgetown University in the 2010 NCAA Division I FCS football season. The team was led by Kevin Kelly, in his fifth season as head coach. The Hoyas played their home games at Multi-Sport Field in Washington, D.C. To open the season, Georgetown broke a 12-game losing streak by beating the Davidson on the road. They finished the season 4–7 overall and 2–3 in Patriot League play.

Schedule

References

Georgetown
Georgetown Hoyas football seasons
Georgetown Hoyas football